MFK Tyumen is a professional futsal club based in Tyumen, Russia. Founded in 1999, the club competes in the Russian Futsal Super League since 2003–04.

Because of the 2022 Russian invasion of Ukraine, FIFA and Union of European Football Associations (UEFA) suspended from FIFA and UEFA competitions all Russian teams, whether national representative teams or club teams.

Current squad

Achievements
 Russian Futsal Super League
 Winners: 2018/2019
 Runner-up: 2009/2010, 2020/2021
 Third place: 2012/2013, 2017/2018

League results

References

External links
 Official Website

Futsal clubs in Russia
Sport in Tyumen
Futsal clubs established in 1999
Tyumen
1999 establishments in Russia